Lagnus monteithorum is a jumping spider species in the genus Lagnus. The female was first identified in 2008 by Barbara Maria Patoleta.

Description

Distribution
Lagnus monteithorum is found in Fiji. The holotype was discovered at the Nadarivatu Reserve on Viti Levu.

References

Spiders of Fiji
Salticidae
Spiders described in 2008